Anagrus atomus is a species of fairyfly. It is an egg parasitoid of Arboridia kermanshah, the grape leafhopper.

References

Mymaridae